The men's tournament of football at the 2011 Summer Universiade at China began on August 11 and ended on August 22. Japan won the gold medal.

Teams

Preliminary round

Group A

Group B

Group C

Group D

Quarterfinal round

Classification 9th–16th place

Quarterfinals

Semifinal round

Classification 13th–16th place

Classification 9th–12th place

Classification 5th–8th place

Semifinals

Final round

15th-place match

13th-place match

11th-place match

9th-place match

7th-place match

5th-place match

Bronze-medal match

Gold-medal match

Final standings

External links
Schedule
Reports

Football at the 2011 Summer Universiade